In cellular biology, stable cells are cells that multiply only when needed. They spend most of the time in the quiescent G0 phase of the cell cycle but can be stimulated to enter the cell cycle when needed. Examples include the liver, the proximal tubules of the kidney and endocrine glands.

See also
 Labile cells, which multiply constantly throughout life
 Permanent cells, which don't have the ability to divide

Cell biology